Bilton School (formerly Herbert Kay and Westlands School, and most recently Bilton High School) is a major secondary school with academy status for pupils aged 11–18 situated within the village of Bilton in Rugby, Warwickshire.  There were 939 students on roll in the 2014-2015 school year, with 69 staff and 17 teaching assistants.

In March 2016, the school was placed in special measures after an OFSTED report found it to be inadequate in every area except its sixth form, which followed a serious decline in examination results over the previous two years.

History
The school was formerly two single-sex schools, Herbert Kay and Westlands. As the school is now mixed-sex it retains a sense of nostalgia by keeping the original terms as classroom titles, each side is now titled Kay Side and West Side. While named Bilton High School, the School ran into confusion with the simple logo that was emblazoned upon its jumpers. The emblem B.H.S was criticised for its similarity to the logo of popular department store British Home Stores. The school acted quickly to change its School symbol to the Bilton Lion with Bilton written underneath.

Uniform
The uniform consists of a Black Blazer with the Bilton School lion, a light grey jumper or cardigan, a white shirt and black trousers or skirt. Boys and girls in years 7-9 wear light blue ties. In year 10-11, boys wear navy and girls wear raspberry red. Year 11 students have the option to wear a blazer, or to just wear a cardigan or jumper.

Achievement
The most recent Ofsted inspection in 2016 found the school to be "Inadequate" in all categories except its sixth form which was rated as "Good", and the school was placed in special measures.  The inspectors highlighted issues of poor leadership, poor behaviour, bullying, and teaching which was handicapped by a large turnover of staff and middle leaders. Despite the report no significant change has been made to the schools leadership, or board of governors. GCSE results had declined from 62% of students gaining 5 good GCSEs (including English and Maths) in 2013, to 36% in 2015. This followed a Section 8 inspection in April 2015 which found that "Leaders and managers have not taken effective action to maintain the high standards of behaviour and attitudes identified at the academy’s previous inspection."

Results (% 5+ A*-C grades)
Source:
 2011: 58%
 2012: 62%
 2013: 62%
 2014: 51%
 2015: 36%
 2016: 57%
 2017: 29%
 2018: 13%

References

Academies in Warwickshire
Educational institutions established in 1977
Schools in Rugby, Warwickshire
Secondary schools in Warwickshire
1977 establishments in England